Pterocomma is a genus of true bugs belonging to the family Aphididae.

The species of this genus are found in Europe and Northern America.

Species:
 Pterocomma alpinum Zhang, Guangxue, Tiesen Zhong & Wanyu Zhang, 1992 
 Pterocomma amargituberculum Zhang, Guangxue, Xiaolin Chen, Tiesen Zhong & Jing

References

Aphididae